Svea Köhrbrück (born 16 October 1993) is a German sprinter. She competed in the women's 4 × 400 metres relay at the 2017 World Championships in Athletics.

References

External links

1993 births
Living people
German female sprinters
World Athletics Championships athletes for Germany
Place of birth missing (living people)